The Pandemonium Creek slide occurred in 1959 in the Coast Mountains of British Columbia, Canada near the valley of the Atnarko River. It was a debris avalanche consisting of 5 million m3 that travelled about 9 km and is thought to have reached speeds of up to 100 m/s.

References

Natural disasters in British Columbia
Landslides in Canada
Landslides in 1959

1959 disasters in Canada